The Centreville Mill is an historic textile mill at 3 Bridal Avenue in West Warwick, Rhode Island.  The mill complex is located on a site that has been used for textile processing since 1794, only four years after Samuel Slater's successful mill operation was established in Pawtucket.  The oldest surviving buildings on the east side of the Pawtuxet River date to the 1860s.

The mill was listed on the National Register of Historic Places in 2005.

See also
National Register of Historic Places listings in Kent County, Rhode Island

References

Industrial buildings completed in 1861
Industrial buildings and structures on the National Register of Historic Places in Rhode Island
Buildings and structures in West Warwick, Rhode Island
1861 establishments in Rhode Island
National Register of Historic Places in Kent County, Rhode Island